Barrhead, Liboside and Uplawmoor is one of the five wards used to elect members of the East Renfrewshire Council. It elects three Councillors.

Councillors

Election results

2022 election

† Greg Turner was suspended from the Conservatives on 21 April 2022, prior to the election, after being linked to derogatory online remarks against Catholics. His name remained on the ballot paper, as the deadline for nominations had passed.

2017 election

Notes

References

Wards of East Renfrewshire
Barrhead